KEKB is a radio station serving Grand Junction, Colorado and its vicinity with a country music format. This station broadcasts on FM frequency 99.9 MHz and is under ownership of Townsquare Media, through licensee Townsquare License, LLC. The station began broadcasting May 24, 1984.

References

External links
99.9 KEKB - Official Site

Country radio stations in the United States
Radio stations established in 1984
EKB
Townsquare Media radio stations
1984 establishments in Colorado